Harrogate was a constituency represented in the House of Commons of the UK Parliament.  As with all constituencies, the constituency elected one Member of Parliament (MP) by the first past the post system of election.  The constituency was renamed Harrogate and Knaresborough in 1997.

Constituency profile
The seat covered an area with little unemployment, a relatively large retired population and large neighbourhoods of high house prices. Until former Chancellor Norman Lamont stood for the first time in the successor seat in the New Labour landslide general election in 1997, it had been part of a Conservative safe seat since 1910. However, Harrogate moved the way of other famous spa towns in England, such as Bath by returning a Liberal Democrat MP.

Boundaries
1950–1983: The Municipal Borough of Harrogate, the Urban District of Knaresborough, and the Rural District of Nidderdale except the civil parishes of Hessay, Knapton, Moor Monkton, Nether Poppleton, Rufforth, and Upper Poppleton.

1983–1997: The Borough of Harrogate wards of Bilton, Claro, Duchy, East Central, Granby, Harlow, Knaresborough East, Knaresborough West, Marston Moor, Nether Poppleton, New Park, Ouseburn, Pannal, Spofforth, Starbeck, Upper Poppleton, Wedderburn, and West Central.

History
Before 1950 Harrogate had been part of the Ripon constituency.  The constituency was created as 'Harrogate' and following boundary changes in 1997 the name was changed to Harrogate and Knaresborough.

Members of Parliament

Election results

Elections in the 1950s

Elections in the 1960s

Elections in the 1970s

Elections in the 1980s

Elections in the 1990s

See also
List of parliamentary constituencies in North Yorkshire

Notes and references
Notes 
  
References

Parliamentary constituencies in Yorkshire and the Humber (historic)
Constituencies of the Parliament of the United Kingdom established in 1950
Politics of the Borough of Harrogate
Constituencies of the Parliament of the United Kingdom disestablished in 1997